Road signs in Austria are regulated in Straßenverkehrsordnung (StVO).

Road signs are generally placed on the right side next to the road or above the road. Sometimes signs are also placed on both sides, in some exceptional cases signs are only place on the left or on one side (particularly town signs).

Austrian warning and prohibitory signs have a white background framed by red edges like most of the European road signs.
However Austria has a different No through road (dead end) - sign as most of the European countries. The sign seems to be a white inverted T and has no red stripe.

Austrian road signs depict people with realistic (as opposed to stylized) silhouettes.

The Vienna Convention on Road Signs and Signals, the country's original signatory, takes its name from the country's capital, Vienna.

Warning signs

Prohibitory signs

Mandatory signs

Priority signs

Informational signs

Additional auxiliary signs

Further signs

Retired signs

References

Austria
Signs